Visoko is a city and municipality in Bosnia and Herzegovina.

Visoko may also refer to:
 Visoko, Varaždin County, a village and municipality in Croatia
 Visoko, Šenčur, a village in the municipality of Šenčur, Slovenia
 Visoko, Ig, a village in the municipality of Ig, Slovenia
 Visoko pri Poljanah, a settlement in the municipality of Škofja Loka, Slovenia
 "Visoko", song by Bulgarian band FSB